Nutbush is a long-standing neighborhood in northeastern Memphis, Tennessee, United States.

The area has since expanded, yet it remains relatively small with modestly sized houses.

Geography
Nutbush is bordered by I-40 to the north; Wells Station to the east; Macon Ave to the south, and Homer Street to the west.  It is adjacent to the city's Kingsbury neighborhood.

National Cemetery

The Memphis National Cemetery is located in Nutbush, Memphis. On 44.2 acres (0.18 km2), the cemetery had 42,184 interments at the end of 2007.

Several battlefield cemeteries from the American Civil War era were transferred to Memphis and many of the dead from the steamboat Sultana explosion on April 26, 1865 were buried in Memphis National Cemetery.

See also
 Memphis, Tennessee

References

Neighborhoods in Memphis, Tennessee